The 2019–20 Kansas Jayhawks men's basketball team represented the University of Kansas in the 2019–20 NCAA Division I men's basketball season, which was the Jayhawks' 122nd basketball season. The Jayhawks, members of the Big 12 Conference, played their home games at Allen Fieldhouse in Lawrence, Kansas. They were led by 17th year Hall of Fame head coach Bill Self.

Season notes
The Jayhawks attempted to rebound from losing six players through the draft and outgoing transfers, including Silvio De Sousa, who had been battling the NCAA regarding his eligibility. De Sousa did state if he wins his appeal regarding the NCAA declaring him ineligible, he would return to Kansas. On May 24, 2019, he won his appeal. Kansas was ranked 3rd in the preseason AP Poll, their 7th consecutive season beginning the season ranked in the top five. Additionally, it was the 201st consecutive poll the Jayhawks have been ranked in, which is the longest active streak in the nation. As of the poll released March 9, 2020, the Jayhawks have extended the streak to 219 consecutive polls ranked. They have not played a game as an unranked team since January 31, 2009. After defeating TCU on March 4, 2020, the Jayhawks clinched their 62nd Regular Season Conference Championship, and their 15th in 16 seasons. It was the first time since the 2009-10 season that KU finished the regular season ranked first in the nation. Additionally, the Jayhawks led the nation in quadrant one wins, went undefeated against unranked teams and only lost games to ranked teams, one each at neutral site, home, and away. The Jayhawks set a team record for combined team GPA with a GPA of 3.21.

COVID-19 pandemic impact

The 2020 Big 12 men's basketball tournament was cancelled March 12 before the quarterfinals were able to begin; The Jayhawks were scheduled to play Oklahoma State. Later that day, the University of Kansas announced that travel for athletics, as well as all home and away athletic events were suspended. That afternoon, the NCAA cancelled the 2020 NCAA tournament prior to the Big 12 naming an automatic bid. It was the first time in the tournament's history it had been canceled. After the cancellation, the NCAA stated it did not intend to name a national champion.

Roster changes

Early draft entrants

Beginning with the 2019 draft, players who declare for the NBA draft and are not selected are able to return to their school if they terminate their agreement with their agent. If they are selected, however, all remaining eligibility is forfeited. Below are any players that declared for the draft. Also indicated is if the player chose to remain in the draft. The class given is the class the player was for the 2018–19 season.

Recruiting class

|-
| colspan="7" style="padding-left:10px;" | Overall recruiting rankings:     247 Sports: 15     Rivals: 17       ESPN: NR 
|}

Transfers

Outgoing

Incoming

Left program before playing

Walk-ons

Roster

Schedule and results

|-
!colspan=12 style=| Exhibition

|-
!colspan=12 style=| Regular Season

|-
!colspan=12 style=| Big 12 Tournament

Rankings

References

Kansas Jayhawks men's basketball seasons
Kansas
2019 in sports in Kansas
2020 in sports in Kansas